Lê Huyền Tông (黎玄宗, 1654 – 16 November 1671) was the 19th emperor of Vietnamese Later Lê dynasty.

Biography
Lê Huyền Tông's birth name is Lê Duy Vũ (黎維禑) and courtesy name Duy Hi (維禧). He was born in 1654 and reigned from 1662 to 1671. He was a figurehead emperor under the power of lord Trịnh Tạc who ruled 1657-82.

After his coronation, he established the diplomatic relation with Qing dynasty in China. He also prohibited people to become Christians.

Family
Consorts and their respective issues :
 Queen Trịnh Thị Ngọc Ang (鄭氏玉𣖮)

References

1654 births
1671 deaths
H
Vietnamese monarchs